There are two types of online high school: private schools and public schools.

Private Schools
North Star Academy
National High School
Orange Lutheran High School Online
Apex Learning High School
Penn Foster
Keystone National High School
Allied National High School
Christa McAuliffe Academy Online
Laurel Springs High School
Abundant Life Academy Online High School
International Virtual Learning Academy
K12.COM
National University Virtual High School
University of Mississippi High School

Public Schools
Mississippi Virtual Public School

References

Alternative education
Distance education institutions based in the United States
Online high schools